Francisco Cañes (1730-1795) was a Spanish Franciscan missionary and grammarian, author of Gramática arábigo-española (1775), a grammar of colloquial Arabic.

Cañes was based at the Spanish Franciscan College in  Damascus, where he came in 1757. Two separate editions of his Arabic grammar were published, one in 1775 and one in 1776.

Works
 Gramatica arabigo-española, vulgar, y literal: Con un diccionario arabigo-español, en que se ponen las voces mas usuales para una conversacion familiar, con el Texto de la Doctrina Cristiana en el idioma arabigo, Madrid, 1775

References

1730 births
1795 deaths
Grammarians from Spain
Spanish Franciscans
18th-century linguists
Grammarians of Arabic